Turnawiec  is a village, in the administrative district of Gmina Czarnocin, within Kazimierza County, Świętokrzyskie Voivodeship, in south-central Poland.

Location

References

Turnawiec